Edpercivalia is a genus of insects known as caddisflies in the family Hydrobiosidae. This genus is endemic to New Zealand. The genus contains the following species:
 Edpercivalia banksiensis
 Edpercivalia borealis
 Edpercivalia cassicola
 Edpercivalia dugdalei
 Edpercivalia flintorum
 Edpercivalia fusca
 Edpercivalia harrisoni
 Edpercivalia maxima
 Edpercivalia morrisi
 Edpercivalia oriens
 Edpercivalia schistaria
 Edpercivalia shandi
 Edpercivalia smithi
 Edpercivalia spaini
 Edpercivalia tahatika
 Edpercivalia thomasoni

References

External links
 iNaturalist

Trichoptera genera
Insects of New Zealand
Endemic fauna of New Zealand
Spicipalpia
Endemic insects of New Zealand